Einar Nilson Gjerstad (Örebro, 30 October 1897 – 8 January 1988) was a Swedish archaeologist. He was most noted for his research of the ancient Mediterranean, particularly known for his work on Cyprus, as well as his studies of early Rome.

Biography
Gjerstad studied at Uppsala University, where he earned a bachelor's degree. 1920, fil.mag. 1921, fil.lic. 1923, and received his doctorate in 1926. In 1922 he was an assistant at excavations in Asine under Axel W. Persson (1888–1951), professor of classical archaeology and ancient history at Uppsala University. From 1926 until 1935 he was professor of classical archaeology and ancient history at Uppsala University.

Gjerstad had the opportunity to go to Cyprus and conduct investigations 1923–1924, for example in Kalopsida. From 1927 until 1931 Gjerstad led the Swedish Cyprus Expedition. The expedition was intended to make a complete study of the ancient culture of Cyprus. Gjerstad served as the expedition's leader with overall responsibility, while Erik Sjöqvist and Alfred Westholm led most of the excavations. He was a pioneer in the study of Cypriot Bichrome ware.

From 1935 until 1940, Gjerstad served as director the Swedish Institute at Rome. When Gjerstad left Rome in 1940, he assumed the position of  Professor of Classical Archaeology and Ancient History at Lund University.

Legacy
On 1 November 1972 president of Cyprus, Makarios III, unveiled in the presence of Gjerstad, a stele at the Palace of Vouni in honour of Einar Gjerstad and the work conducted by the Swedish Cyprus Expedition.

A street has been named after him in Larnaca, Cyprus. (It is adjacent to the Bamboula archaeological site of Kition.)

Publications
 1926 Studies on Prehistoric Cyprus
 1934 The Swedish Cyprus Expedition: Finds and Results of the Excavation in Cyprus 1927-1931. Vol. I
 1935 The Swedish Cyprus Expedition: Finds and Results of the Excavation in Cyprus 1927-1931. Vol. II
 1937 The Swedish Cyprus Expedition: Finds and Results of the Excavation in Cyprus 1927-1931. Vol. III
 1953 Early Rome Vol. I: Stratigraphical researches in the Forum Romanum and along the Sacra Via
 1956 Early Rome Vol. II: The tombs
 1960 Early Rome Vol. III: Fortifications, domestic architecture, sanctuaries, stratigraphic excavations
 1962 Legends and Facts of Early Roman History
 1966 Early Rome Vol. IV: Synthesis of archaeological evidence
 1973 Early Rome Vol. V: The written sources
 1973 Early Rome Vol. VI: Historical survey
 1977 Greek Geometric and Archaic Pottery found in Cyprus, Stockholm: Swedish Institute in Athens.
 1980 Ages and Days in Cyprus, Paul Åström, Göteborg.
 Kıbrıs Macerası – The Cyprus Adventure – Περιπετεια στην Κυπρο  (1927 - 1931), Galeri Kültür Kitabevi, Lefkoşa 2013 Published in three languages: Turkish, English and Greek. Marie-Louise Winbladh, Galeri Kültür Kitabevi, Lefkoşa, Cyprus 2013
 Adventuring with Cyprus. A Chronicle of the Swedish Cyprus Expedition 1927 – 1931.  Marie-Louise Winbladh 2016
 Adventures of an archaeologist. Memoirs of a museum curator, Marie-Louise Winbladh, AKAKIA Publications, London 2020

References

Other Sources
Einar Gjerstad research papers, 1806-1984, Getty Research Institute, Los Angeles. Accession No. 900228.  The archive includes research notes, photographs, drawings, typescripts and publication production materials for Gjerstad's extensive studies of the archaeology of Cyprus and early Rome.
"Einar Gjerstad," in A Historical Dictionary of Classical Archaeology, ed. Nancy T. de Grummond (Greenwood Press, Westport, Connecticut 1996).
Einar Gjerstad's Cypriote publications. A bibliography by Paul Astrom. 

1897 births
1988 deaths
People from Örebro
Swedish archaeologists
Classical archaeologists
20th-century archaeologists
Academic staff of Lund University
Uppsala University alumni
Corresponding Fellows of the British Academy
Members of the Royal Swedish Academy of Sciences